The Llanberis Lake Railway is a  narrow gauge heritage railway that runs for  along the northern shore of Llyn Padarn in north Wales in the Snowdonia National Park. The starting point is the village of Llanberis at the eastern end of the lake, with the western terminus at Pen Llyn in the Padarn Country Park. The return journey takes around 60 minutes.

History

Early proposals 

The Llanberis Lake Railway runs along part of the trackbed of the defunct Padarn Railway, a  gauge line which connected the quarry with Y Felinheli (Port Dinorwic) on the Menai Strait. The Padarn Railway closed in October 1961 and was lifted between 16 May 1962 and February 1963. Following the closure of the Padarn Railway, various plans were made to open a  gauge tourist railway on the trackbed. The first serious attempt was made by G. Ward, a local resident, who proposed a railway that would circle Llyn Padarn using the trackbeds of the British Rail Llanberis branch and the Padarn Railway. This plan would have utilized track and locomotives from the Dinorwic slate quarry, but the company did not pursue the proposal.

Quarry closure and formation of the railway company 

In July 1966, A. Lowry Porter of Southend-on-Sea proposed a shorter railway running from the quarry company's workshops at Gilfach Ddu near Llanberis to Penllyn, along the easternmost three miles of Padarn Railway trackbed. Negotiations were progressing with the company, when in July 1969 the quarry closed at short notice. The quarry's workshops at Gilfach Ddu were purchased by the Gwynedd County Council with the intention of creating a Country Park.

The quarry's land and equipment were put up for auction, and Lowry Porter's fledgling railway company purchased three steam locomotives and one diesel locomotive for use on the planned lake railway. In June 1970 the County Council purchased the trackbed of the Padarn Railway and agreed to allow its use for the lake railway.

The Ruston diesel locomotive was quickly put into service laying track. Meanwhile, the first steam locomotive, Dolbadarn, was restored to working order. The new railway was built to  narrow gauge instead of the more unusual  narrow gauge used in the quarries. This required all the rolling stock to be regauged, including the locomotives. Tracklaying progressed during 1970 using track recovered from several sources, including some originally used on the Lynton and Barnstaple Railway.

New carriages were built using the chassis of bogie wagons. These initial efforts at creating passenger stock proved unsatisfactory – they had a tendency to derail due to their very rigid construction. This caused a delay in opening, and a subsequent rapid redesign of the carriages.

Early years 

The railway officially opened on 28 May 1971 but because of the need to redesign the carriage stock, the first public trains did not run until 19 July 1971. By the end of the first season, more than 30,000 passengers had been carried. In the winter of 1971 the railway was extended to its current terminus at Penllyn. For the beginning of the 1972 season, a second steam locomotive Red Damsel was returned to service with a new name: Elidir. The locomotive roster was expanded that year to include Maid Marian (now operating on the Bala Lake Railway) and an 0-4-0 tank locomotive built by Jung in Germany.

Llanberis extension 

In June 2003 the railway was extended to the town of Llanberis, with a new station close to the start of the Snowdon Mountain Railway. The original terminus at Gilfach Ddu is now a through station serving both the National Slate Museum and the nearby Dolbadarn Castle. On the return journey from Pen Llyn, passengers may alight at Cei Llydan station, where a picnic site is available with views of the Snowdonian mountains above Llanberis Pass.

Operations 

The railway uses three steam locomotives ("Elidir", "Dolbadarn" and "Thomas Bach") all of which ran on the internal  gauge lines of the Dinorwic Quarry. There are also several diesel locomotives which are used for works trains and when the steam locomotives are unavailable for passenger trains.

When the Quarry closed down in 1969 the lakeside section of the trackbed was utilised for the current Llanberis Lake Railway, originally running from the National Slate Museum at Gilfach Ddu to Pen Llyn. Gilfach Ddu was the main engineering workshop of the Dinorwic Quarry and provided repair facilities for all of the steam locomotives of the quarry system.

Locomotives

Current locomotives

Former locomotives

These are locomotives that ran on the Llanberis Lake Railway in the past, but have now moved to other locations.

Locomotives formerly on site

These are locomotives that were stored at the Llanberis Lake Railway in the past, that have now moved to other locations. They did not run on the LLR during their stay.

See also

British narrow gauge railways

References

External links

Official website

Heritage railways in Gwynedd
1 ft 11½ in gauge railways in Wales